The Forest Pool is a 1938 picture book by Laura Adams Armer. The book was a recipient of a 1939 Caldecott Honor for its illustrations.

References

1938 children's books
American picture books
Caldecott Honor-winning works